The Olympus mju (Greek letter μ[mju:], Olympus Stylus in North America) is a series of compact film and digital cameras manufactured by Olympus.

Models

Digital (MetaData for Camera Model is listed after U.S. model nomenclature)
Olympus mju 300 (Stylus 300, 3.2 megapixels)
Olympus mju 400 (Stylus 400, 4.0 megapixels) also known as μ-30 DIGITAL (from 2004)
Olympus mju 410 (Stylus 410, 4.0 megapixels)
Olympus mju 500 (Stylus 500, 5.0 megapixels)
Olympus mju 600 (Stylus 600, 6.0 megapixels)
Olympus mju 710 (Stylus 710, 7.1 megapixels)
Olympus mju 720 SW (Stylus 720 SW, 7.1 megapixels) u720SW,S720SW
Olympus mju 725 (Stylus 725, 7.1 megapixels) New Model as of Oct 2006
Olympus mju 730 (Stylus 730, 7.1 megapixels) 
Olympus mju 740 (Stylus 740, 7.1 megapixels) 
Olympus mju 750 (Stylus 750, 7.1 megapixels)
Olympus mju 800 (Stylus 800, 8.0 megapixels)
Olympus mju 810 (Stylus 810, 8.0 megapixels)
Olympus mju 1000 (Stylus 1000, 10.0 megapixels)
Olympus mju 1010 (Stylus 1010, 10.1 megapixels)
Olympus mju 1020 (Stylus 1020, 10.1 megapixels)
Olympus mju 1030 SW (Stylus 1030 SW, 10.1 megapixels) (Olympus μ 1030 SW)
Olympus mju 1040 (Stylus 1040, 10.1 megapixels)
Olympus mju 1200 (Stylus 1200, 12.0 megapixels)

Film
Olympus mju, (Stylus in North America), 1991
Olympus mju Stylus QD (in North America)
Olympus mju Zoom 105 (Stylus Zoom 105), 1996
Olympus mju II,  (Stylus Epic), 1997
Olympus mju II Zoom (Stylus Epic Zoom 80), 1998
Olympus mju Zoom 115 QD (Stylus Epic Zoom 115 QD, 1997)
Olympus mju Zoom 140 (Stylus Zoom 140, 1998)
Olympus mju Zoom Wide 80 (Stylus Zoom Wide 80)
Olympus mju Zoom 105 (Stylus Zoom 105)
Olympus mju III Wide 100 (Stylus 100 Wide)
Olympus mju III 120 (Stylus III 120)
Olympus mju III 150 (Stylus III 150)
Olympus mju II 170VF (Stylus Epic Zoom 170 QD)
Olympus mju Zoom 105 (Stylus Select 105)

References

External links
 Camera-wiki
 Olympus History

μ
μ